Mannix is an American television show that aired between 1967 and 1975. 

Mannix may also refer to:

Surname
 Brian Mannix (born 1961), Australian rock singer and actor
 Daniel Mannix (1864–1963), longtime Catholic Archbishop of Melbourne
 Daniel P. Mannix (1911–1997), author and journalist
 David Mannix (born 1985), English retired footballer
 Eddie Mannix (1891–1963), American film studio executive and "fixer"
 Elizabeth A. Mannix, Cornell University management professor
 Fred Mannix (born 1942), Canadian billionaire businessman
 Fred Mannix Jr. (born 1983/84), Canadian polo player, son of Fred Mannix
 Frederick S. Mannix (1881–1951), Canadian entrepreneur, grandfather of Fred Mannix
 Kevin Mannix (born 1949), American politician
 Simon Mannix (born 1971), New Zealand rugby union football coach and former player
 Toni Mannix (1906–1983), American actress, dancer and wife of Eddie Mannix

Given name
 Mannix Flynn, Irish author and artist
 Mannix Román (born 1983), Puerto Rican volleyball player

Other uses
 Mannix (album), the 1969 soundtrack for the television show
 Mannix College (Monash University), an Australian residential college named after Daniel Mannix